Taj FC is a Palauan association football club founded in 2012 which plays in the Palau Soccer League, the top level league in Palau.

History
Taj FC was founded in 2012 as a club to take part in the Palau Soccer League, which started the same year. They were runners-up in their first season of competition in the 2012 Spring League.

Honors
Palau Soccer League Runners up: 1
2012 Spring League.

Players

2012 Squad

References
Shane Moon WAS The Sark Manager And Now, He Is The Taj F.C Manager. 

Football clubs in Palau
2004 establishments in Palau